Pęzino  (formerly German Pansin) is a village in the administrative district of Gmina Stargard, within Stargard County, West Pomeranian Voivodeship, in north-western Poland.

For the history of the region, see History of Pomerania. The village has a population of 1,162.

References

Villages in Stargard County